Tryapino (Teräpä) is a rural locality (a selo) and the administrative centre of Tryapinsky Selsoviet, Aurgazinsky District, Bashkortostan, Russia. The population was 452 as of 2010. There are 7 streets.

Geography 
Tryapino is located 24 km northeast of Tolbazy (the district's administrative centre) by road. Novogurovka is the nearest rural locality.

References 

Rural localities in Aurgazinsky District